is a Japanese footballer currently playing for Tiamo Hirakata.

Club career statistics
Updated to 23 February 2018.

Honours
Gamba Osaka
 AFC Champions League (1) : 2008

Kashima Antlers
 J. League Cup (1) : 2012
 Suruga Bank Championship (1) : 2012

References

External links

Profile at Renofa Yamaguchi

1987 births
Living people
Association football people from Osaka Prefecture
People from Sakai, Osaka
Japanese footballers
Japan youth international footballers
J1 League players
J2 League players
J3 League players
Gamba Osaka players
Avispa Fukuoka players
Kashima Antlers players
Albirex Niigata players
Oita Trinita players
Fagiano Okayama players
Renofa Yamaguchi FC players
AC Nagano Parceiro players
Association football forwards